Oleh Dopilka (born 12 March 1986 in Kiev, Ukrainian SSR) is a Ukrainian football defender who plays for FC Uzhhorod.

Career
When he was younger, Dopilka played for Dynamo's reserve team Dynamo-2 Kyiv, which participates Ukrainian First League. Dopilka has also played for the Ukraine national under-21 football team but was promoted in 2007 to the senior Ukraine national football team.

See also
 2005 FIFA World Youth Championship squads#Ukraine

References

External links
 Player profile at the Dynamo Kyiv Official Website 
 
 

1986 births
Living people
Footballers from Kyiv
Ukrainian footballers
Ukraine international footballers
Ukraine youth international footballers
Ukraine under-21 international footballers
FC Dynamo Kyiv players
FC Dynamo-2 Kyiv players
FC Dynamo-3 Kyiv players
FC Kryvbas Kryvyi Rih players
FC Hoverla Uzhhorod players
FC Zirka Kropyvnytskyi players
FC Sevastopol players
FC Oleksandriya players
FC Mynai players
FC Uzhhorod players
Ukrainian Premier League players
Association football defenders
21st-century Ukrainian people